THX is a suite of high fidelity audiovisual reproduction standards for movie theaters, screening rooms, home theaters, computer speakers, video game consoles, car audio systems, and video games. The famous THX trailer that precedes movies is based on the Deep Note, with a distinctive glissando up from a rumbling low pitch.

THX was developed by Tomlinson Holman at George Lucas's company Lucasfilm in 1983 to ensure that the soundtrack for the third Star Wars film, Return of the Jedi, would be accurately reproduced in the best venues. THX was named after Holman's initials, with the "X" standing for "crossover" or "experiment". The name is also an homage to Lucas's first film, THX 1138 (1971). Deep Note was created by Holman's co-worker James A. Moorer. THX Ltd. was founded on May 20, 1983 by Lucas and Holman, and headquartered in San Francisco, California.

THX is a quality assurance system, not a recording technology. All sound recording formats, whether digital (Dolby Digital, DTS, SDDS) or analog (Dolby Stereo, Ultra Stereo), can be reproduced in a THX system. THX-certified theaters provide a high-quality, predictable playback environment to ensure that any film soundtrack mixed in THX will sound as near as possible to the intentions of the mixing engineer. THX also provides certified theaters with a special crossover circuit whose use is part of the standard. Certification of an auditorium entails specific acoustic and other technical requirements; architectural requirements include a floating floor, baffled and acoustically treated walls, non-parallel walls (to reduce standing waves), a perforated screen (to allow center channel continuity), and NC30 rating for background noise ("ensures noise from air conditioning units and projection equipment does not mask the subtle effects in a movie's soundtrack").

On June 12, 2002, THX was spun off as a separate company from Lucasfilm and sold to sound card manufacturer Creative Technology Limited, which held a 60% share of the company. Under Creative Technology, the company developed several further innovations, such as the first THX-certified audio card for computers, the Sound Blaster Audigy 2. In 2016, THX was acquired by video game hardware company Razer Inc.

History
In 1982, George Lucas and his company, Lucasfilm, were preparing to release Return of the Jedi, the third film in the Star Wars trilogy. The C Building had been constructed in San Rafael, California, where Industrial Light & Magic and much of Lucasfilm occupied a series of work bays and office complexes along Kerner Boulevard. The C Building boasted a shooting stage, editing facilities, computer server rooms, and a large theater as a state-of-the-art sound mixing room. That year, Lucas and his team were working on Return of the Jedi when a major situation began to arise. They brought their film to test in a commercial theater to find out that much of the audio detail and quality they mixed for countless hours in the studio was simply missing when played back in the cinema. Lucas's team was unable to hear the classic Princess Leia theme, and the famous Star Wars soundtrack and sound effects, and the background noise in the theater had become much worse, muffling most of the film's sound while playing through the theater's commercial sound system. During this time, many movie theaters all over the world had poor room acoustics with mono surround sound.

To fix the problem, Lucas established a quality standard for commercial theaters that would use the best technology to consistently translate filmmakers' work to the theater. Tomlinson Holman, a skilled audio engineer and scientist largely responsible for the design of the theater, had become an employee of Lucasfilm in 1980. In the process of enhancing the setup for the new Sprocket Systems theater, Holman and Lucas invented a complex system that arranged speakers to best fit the architectural space within the theater. Using an intricate crossover network that integrated equipment with the room's unique acoustics, it became perhaps the best quality system anyone could remember hearing. Sprocket Systems mixed the Return of the Jedi sound in the room, the first Lucasfilm production mixed in Northern California. Visiting filmmakers and studio executives were astounded at what they heard. Jim Kessler, who hired Holman, thought of calling the system "Tomlinson Holman's Crossover", or, as originally abbreviated, "XVR". He then changed the "VR" to "TH", but he realized that was the name for George Lucas's first film, THX 1138, and found that would be a fitting name. They eventually changed the "X"'s meaning to "experiment".

Four movie theaters in the United States fully installed THX sound systems, becoming the first THX certified theaters. To introduce the new system, James A. Moorer created an ear-catching sound called the Deep Note. THX was dedicated on May 20, 1983, and the first trailer and Deep Note premiered on time with the release of Return of the Jedi in theaters five days later. It was billed as the first advance in the motion picture loudspeaker systems since 1948.

In 1990, Lucasfilm unveiled the Home THX Audio System at the Consumer Electronics Show in Chicago. That year, a demo LaserDisc dubbed Wow! was unveiled. It featured various clips from Star Wars, Indiana Jones, and Willow. Three years later in 1993, The Abyss was released on LaserDisc, making it the first time THX was used on that device. In 1995, the Star Wars trilogy became the first THX certified VHS release. In 1997, Twister became the first digitally mastered THX release on the new DVD format.

In early 2002, it was announced that Lincoln became the first auto company to offer THX-certified premium car audio systems. A concept sound system for the Lincoln Blackwood showcased the potential for in-car multi-channel surround sound, demonstrated at the THX booth at the Consumer Electronics Show in Las Vegas. The license ensured that high-performance audio systems in Lincoln vehicles met the exacting sound quality and performance standards of its new THX Ultra Premium Car Audio program, beginning with the 2003 Lincoln LS, which was introduced later that year.

THX separated from Lucasfilm and became an independent company in June 2002. The company's headquarters continued in Marin County, California, with offices in Burbank and plan for international expansion. It expanded into gaming and car audio systems. On the professional front, THX planned to continue the expansion of its theatrical certification programs as it became more involved in digital cinema.

On September 30, 2003, THX announced its seal of approval for video game audio. Electronic Arts became the first company to achieve the game certification. This helped improve game sound, measuring the credibility of games at a time when the industry became important to the entertainment market. Five games by Electronic Arts, including Need for Speed: Underground, Medal of Honor: Rising Sun and The Lord of the Rings: The Return of the King carried logos on their box and pre-game trailers. In 2020, THX Certified Game Mode was introduced, with enhanced contrast and color, and reduced input lag, and greater accuracy to the producers' intentions. It has judder and smear reduction, meaning that the picture remained crisp with a quick rise time between dark-to-light transitions. On August 3, TCL Technology revealed the first television to include THX Certified Game Mode, a 6-Series TCL Roku TV.

In 2006, THX began to certify high definition Blu-ray discs, starting with Terminator 2: Judgment Day.

A 3D product certification called THX 3D Display premiered in 2010. The first 3D television to feature this technology is the LG Infinia PX950 Plasma HDTV series. To earn the new THX 3D Display Certification, the PX950 passed more than 400 laboratory tests evaluating left and right eye images for color accuracy, cross-talk, viewing angles, and video processing performance. The PX950 had to pass THX certification for picture quality in 2D, which is required for THX 3D certification. Viewers can select THX 2D or 3D cinema modes for 2D or 3D movie experiences from broadcast sources and Blu-ray discs. Four new THX-certified 3D JVC projectors were unveiled during this time. These were the Reference Series DLA-RS60 and DLA-RS50, marketed by JVC's Professional Products Company, and the Precision Series DLA-X9 and DLA-X7.

In early 2013, THX unveiled a new app called THX Tune-Up in time for Super Bowl, available on App Store and Google Play. It was billed as the company's first mobile app.

On March 14, 2013, THX filed a lawsuit against Apple Inc., alleging patent infringement, Bloomberg L.P. prior to a federal court in Northern California.

THX expanded to China in 2014 with new offices in Beijing and a partnership with China Film Group Corporation to redefine the cinema experience. The first THX Certified China Giant Screen (CGS) auditoriums opened Shanghai in September.
In December 2014, THX teamed up with Warren Theatres, opening a large theater complex opened in Broken Arrow, Oklahoma on December 23. Each of the 18 auditoriums in this theater was THX certified and two new Grand Infinity Auditoriums were introduced. They were designed by Bill Warren to revolutionize the large format movie-going experience. These auditoriums featured THX Certification, patented deep curved screens, 64-channel Dolby Atmos sound and the first 4K laser projector in the United States.

The company was acquired by Razer Inc. in October 2016.

The first THX-certified laptop was released in 2017, the Razer Blade Pro.
THX introduced Spatial Audio in 2018, a new positional audio solution for an immersive 360-degree sound experience through headphones and speakers. The technology was used on the Kraken gaming headset for simulated 7.1 surround sound. These headphones were included with a Spatial Audio app. This would be later used on Windows 10 devices.

On May 2, 2018, it was announced that over 200 Cinemark XD locations in the United States and Latin America would feature a THX sound system. These auditoriums featured enormous wall-to-wall screens, 2D and 3D digital projection, immersive, surround sound, premium seats with Luxury Lounger electric recliners, and THX Certification. Both companies had first announced the partnership one year prior in 2017. The first THX Ultimate Cinema debuted at Regency Westwood Village in Los Angeles in 2019. This theater provided exhibitors with a branded and differentiated PLF offering that included projection technology from Cinionic, and an immersive audio system, acoustics, and auditorium specifications that met THX certification standards.

In September 2020, Walmart stores began to sell Gateway laptops and tablets, which were tuned by THX, ensuring brighter contrast with more rich vibrant screen colors. They combined style, performance, and value in a wide range of products for consumers, students, and creators. The laptops featured THX Spatial Audio that delivered an authentic 7.1 surround experience through built-in speakers and attached headphones.

THX premiered its first consumer electronic product called the Onyx in 2021, a mobile headphone DAC and amplifier using THX AAA technology.

Applications 

The first THX theater is the University of Southern California's Eileen L. Norris Cinema Theatre, a part of USC's film school.

Certifications 

THX has created a certification process for additional products including home audio, home theater, video, and automotive sound components and products. THX certification extends to home audio receivers, speakers, desktop systems, soundbars, acoustic materials, microphones, and HDMI cables.

THX Certified Ultra 

THX Certified Select

THX Certified Compact 

THX Certified Dominus 
THX Certified Dominus products are for expansive home theater spaces,  in size, with a  viewing distance from the screen.

I/S Plus Systems 
These THX certified home theater in a box systems are so far exclusively made by Onkyo. and Enclave Audio.

Multimedia products 
THX Certified Multimedia Products are designed and engineered for PC gaming and multimedia on the desktop.

THX Certified Optimode and Optimizer 
THX Certified DVD and video displays (plasma display and LCD or LED flat panels and projectors) including THX Optimode and Optimizer which allows users to see a program or the movie as originally intended. Some tests required the use of special "blue filter glasses," which would either be included with the Optimizer disc, or sold separately on the THX website at the time.

The first DVD release to include the THX Optimode is 20th Century Fox's Fight Club, which was released on June 6, 2000.

Mascot

THX's mascot is a robot named Tex, created by John Lasseter, the head of Pixar Animation Studios. He first appeared in the original Tex trailer, which premiered in theaters on July 3, 1996, with the theatrical release of Independence Day, in which he fixes up the THX logo. A second trailer called Tex 2: Moo Can premiered in theaters on November 26, 1997, with the original theatrical release of Alien Resurrection. Less than a decade later on June 9, 2006, the Tex 3: Action trailer premiered with the release of Cars. They were later seen in some prints of early Pixar animated films on DVDs including Toy Story, A Bug's Life, Toy Story 2, Monsters, Inc., Finding Nemo and Cars. In 2005, the trailers were not shown in the original home media on another Pixar animated feature film, The Incredibles which has the Cavalcade trailer instead. The Moo Can trailer is in some 20th Century Fox DVDs, such as Speed 2: Cruise Control and The Day the Earth Stood Still.

Deep Note

See also 

 Home cinema
 AV receiver

References

External links 
 
 Home Theatre Program launch

Film sound production
Companies based in San Francisco
Electronics companies established in 1983
American companies established in 1983
1983 establishments in California
Privately held companies based in California
George Lucas
Lucasfilm
2016 mergers and acquisitions
Razer Inc.